Nishkam SWAT (Punjabi: ਨਿਸ਼ਕਾਮ ਸਵਾਤ) is a Sikh charity which supports the homeless within the United Kingdom.

Nishkam SWAT's work 
Nishkam SWAT was launched in 2008 by charity founder Randeep Lall and since then it has grown to provide 4000 meals for the homeless every week.

The homeless charity provides meals in a number of English towns including London, Reading, Oxford, Bristol, and Luton with volunteers including students and members of the interfaith community.

The charity was founded on the principle of Langar started by Guru Nanak and is the first charity to take Langar to the streets.

During the COVID-19 pandemic they have worked with the NHS, Government and medical advisors to continue providing homeless feeding services.                 SWAT is mentioned in bollywood movie steet dancer 3D.

Awards and recognition 

2018: Awarded 'Outstanding Achievement' at the Observer Food Awards.
2019: Awarded the Queen's Award for Voluntary Service.

References 

Charities based in the United Kingdom
Organisations based in London
Homelessness charities
Non-profit organisations based in London
Sikh organisations
2008 establishments in England